Osa Guobadia (born 1 June 1987), best known by his nickname Ice-Cream, is a Nigerian former professional footballer who played as a right midfielder, central midfielder, defensive midfielder, or attacking midfielder.

Career
After playing with SV Pasching in the Austrian Bundesliga, Guobadia had short spells in other Austrian clubs, namely FC Wels, SC Schwanenstadt and ASV St. Marienkirchen.

In summer 2008 he moved to Macedonia signing with Macedonian First League side FK Makedonija Gjorče Petrov. After two seasons he returned to Nigeria playing one year with Kaduna United F.C. in the Nigeria Premier League, before returning to Macedonia this time to play with another top flight side, FK Vardar.

Honours
FK Makedonija GP
 Macedonian First League: 2008–09

FK Vardar
 Macedonian First League: 2011–12

References

External links
 
 Profile at Guardian's Stats Centre

1987 births
Living people
Nigerian footballers
Sportspeople from Benin City
Association football midfielders
FC Juniors OÖ players
Austrian Football Bundesliga players
FK Makedonija Gjorče Petrov players
FK Vardar players
Beitar Jerusalem F.C. players
Kaduna United F.C. players
Israeli Premier League players
Nigerian expatriate footballers
Expatriate footballers in Austria
Expatriate footballers in North Macedonia
Expatriate footballers in Israel
Expatriate footballers in Malta
Nigerian expatriate sportspeople in Austria
Nigerian expatriate sportspeople in North Macedonia
Nigerian expatriate sportspeople in Israel
Nigerian expatriate sportspeople in Malta